Krnjača railway station is a railway station serving the settlement of Krnjača, in Palilula municipality of Belgrade, Serbia.

Updated in 2016, the station has two side platforms with four tracks. It is served by BG Voz and by Srbija Voz line 52 connecting Pančevo Vojlovica to Pančevački Most.

The station has no connections with other public transport.

References 

Railway stations in Belgrade
Palilula, Belgrade